I Believe is the second studio album by the Canadian Muslim singer and songwriter Irfan Makki on Awakening Records. The album was released on July 28, 2011.

Track listing
The original version of the album contains 13 tracks.

References

2011 albums
Irfan Makki albums
Arabic-language albums
Awakening Music albums